The flag of Khanty-Mansi autonomous okrug, in the Russian Federation, is a rectangular field arranged with two strips at even proportions (azure on top, and green on bottom). A vertical white strip is attached to the fly side of the flag. A stylized crown at the upper hoist side is charged on the azure strip.

The flag was adopted on 20 September 1995. The crown was modified on December 6 of that same year.  The proportions are 1:2.

See also 
Coat of arms of Khanty-Mansi Autonomous Okrug
Anthem of Khanty-Mansi Autonomous Okrug

References

External links 
Flags of the World

Flag
Flags of the federal subjects of Russia
Khanty
Flags of the Arctic
Flags introduced in 1995